Castanopsis paucispina is a tree in the family Fagaceae. The specific epithet  is from the Latin meaning "few spines", referring to the sparsely spined cupule.

Description
The brown bark is smooth to slightly cracked.

Distribution and habitat
Castanopsis paucispina is endemic to Borneo. Its habitat is hill dipterocarp forests up to  altitude.

References

paucispina
Endemic flora of Borneo
Trees of Borneo
Plants described in 1968
Flora of the Borneo lowland rain forests